Suleiman Kabalan Frangieh, last name also spelled Frangié, Franjieh, or Franjiyeh (15 June 1910 – 23 July 1992), was a Lebanese Maronite politician who was President of Lebanon from 1970 to 1976.

Early life and education
Suleiman Frangieh was a scion of one of the leading Maronite families of Zgharta, near Tripoli; the family's name comes from the Greek Φρὰγκοι (pron. "Franggi"), after the Franks.

Frangieh was born in Zgharta on 15 June 1910. He was the second son of a politician, Kabalan Suleiman Frangieh. His mother was Lamia Raffoul. Kabalan Frangieh was district governor of Ehden (1908–1913) and a member of the Parliament (1929–1932). His grandfather, Suleiman Ghnatios Frangieh, was district governor of Ehden (1904–1908). Suleiman Frangieh's brother Hamid served as foreign minister under the French mandate in 1939. Though the Frangieh family were landowners in Ottoman times, they might have acquired most of their wealth through trade and business activities.

Suleiman Kabalan Frangieh received education at Antoura, near Beirut. He was also educated in Tripoli and Beirut.

Career and presidency
Suleiman Frangieh dealt with the export-import business in Beirut for a time before his political career. In 1957, he was accused in the machine-gun slaying of more than 20 members of a competing clan, the Douaihys, in a church not far from Zgharta. More specifically, he was believed to be responsible for killing around 700 people, 20 of them Christians shot to death during a requiem mass in the north Lebanese town of Miziara. Therefore, he had to take refuge in the Syrian coastal city of Latakia, where he met with two Syrian army officers, Hafez and Rifaat Assad who would be his friends. In 1958, he benefited from the amnesty and returned to Lebanon.

In 1960, Frangieh was elected to his elder brother Hamid's old seat in the Lebanese Parliament. He also became the head of his clan due to Hamid's illness. Frangieh was reelected to the Parliament in 1964 and 1968. Until 1970, he held the following ministerial posts: minister of post, telegraph and telephone (1960–1961), minister of agriculture (1961), minister of interior (1968), minister of justice (1968–1969) and minister of economy (1968–1970).

In the closest and possibly most controversial presidential election in Lebanese history, the National Assembly elected Frangieh to the Presidency of the Republic on 23 September 1970. He owed his upset victory over Elias Sarkis, the official candidate of the Chehabi regime to a last minute change of mind by Kamal Jumblatt, whose supporters in the Parliament switched their votes to Frangieh.

Posing as a consensus candidate, Frangieh drew support from both the right and the left and from all religious factions; his election was a backlash to the administrations of Presidents of Fuad Chehab (1958–1964) and Charles Helou (1964–1970) and the "Deuxième Bureau" run by the preceding two administrations of Chehab and Helou, as the opposing candidate Elias Sarkis who was head of the Banque du Liban (Central Bank of Lebanon) was widely seen as a continuation of the earlier Chehabi regime.

There were three rounds of elections that year:
Round 1 – 99 Deputies, 5 candidates – no majority
Round 2 – 99 Deputies, 2 candidates – 50 votes each (1 fake vote found), round was negated.
Round 3 – 99 Deputies, 2 candidates, Kamal Jumblatt assigns one of his deputies to vote for Frangieh.  Suleiman Frangieh becomes President legally. The events listed above as per the testimony of the late Kamal Joumblatt of his role in the vote.

Sabri Hamadeh, then Speaker of Parliament, had refused to announce the election of a President on a 1-vote difference. As Hamadeh exited parliament Michel Sassine, Deputy Speaker of Parliament, stepped up and exercised his powers of Deputy to announce Frangieh President. Frangieh's term lasted until 22 September 1976.

Frangie's term ended in 1976 when Elias Sarkis was elected as president. However, Sarkis could move to office four months after his election on 23 September 1976, since Frangieh objected at first to leave office.

Civil War years
Civil war in Lebanon began on 13 April 1975. Frangieh as the Lebanese President declared the Constitutional Document on 14 February 1976 that was the first serious initiative to end the conflict and reach a consensus. The document empowered prime minister and suggested a "parity between Christians and Muslims in Parliament", reducing the power of Maronites. Although it was supported by major politicians and religious leaders, it could not achieve its objectives.

Then Frangieh invited Syrian troops into Lebanon in May 1976 in the early stages of the Lebanese Civil War. He had full support of the Lebanese Christians in this regard, since they thought that Syria would be able to force a cease-fire and protect Christians. He is regarded as in large part being responsible for Lebanon's descent into war in the mid-1970s.

When the Lebanese Civil War began, Frangieh maintained a militia, the Marada Brigade, under the command of his son Tony Frangieh. He initially participated in the Lebanese Front, a right-wing, mainly Christian, coalition of politicians and militia leaders, but in early 1978 he broke with them because of his own pro-Syrian leanings. In June 1978, Tony, together with his wife and infant daughter, was assassinated by militiamen with Phalangist militia being accused of the plot. The killings are known as Ehden massacre after which the power of the Frangiehs decreased. Ever since then, Suleiman Frangieh was reported to have been depressed. He swore to take revenge, declaring in an interview "the family will exact its retribution." By some accounts, he went on to engineer the killing of hundreds of Phalange members.

Later years
Frangieh remained an ally of Syria. In July 1983, after Amine Gemayel became president, Frangieh along with Rashid Karami and Walid Jumblatt formed a Syrian-backed National Salvation Front to challenge Gemayel's rule and the pact between Lebanon and Israel that was financially supported by the United States. Later Syria tried to make Frangieh president for second term after the end of Amine Gemayel's term in 1988, but the National Assembly failed to achieve a quorum owing to a boycott by some Christian parliamentarians enforced by the Lebanese Forces militia. In fact, Frangieh announced his candidacy on 17 August 1988.

Personal life
Suleiman Frangieh had five children with his Egypt-born wife, Iris Handaly: two sons, Tony and Robert, and three daughters, Lamia, Sonia and Maya. Of his daughters Sonia was married to Abdullah Al Rasi who was a physician and politician.

In June 1978, Suleiman Frangieh's son Tony Frangieh, himself then a Member of Parliament, was killed together with his wife, Vera, three-year-old daughter, Jihane, and thirty other Marada partisans in the Ehden massacre. Suleiman Frangieh Jr., the son of the murdered MP, first became the Minister of Public Health at the age of 22, and he served as the Ministry of Interior from 2004 to 2005. He is known to have served with the Marada Brigade in the 1980s.

Frangieh was called in Lebanon as "the tough man" due to his harsh tongue, volatile temper and ruthless approach to some of his opponents. Robert Fisk describes Frangieh as a "Christian warlord, mafioso, militia strongman, grief-stricken father, corrupt president, mountain baron and, eventually, a thoughtful, intelligent, rather frightening old man, living out his last years beside the lions of Ehden."

Death
Suleiman Frangieh died at age 82 in the hospital of the American University in Beirut, after three weeks of hospitalization, on 23 July 1992. He reportedly died of acute pneumonia and had heart and stomach ailments. He was buried in Ehden next to his son Tony.

References

External links
Sleiman Frangieh on Ehden Family Tree Website 

1910 births
1992 deaths
Suleiman
Lebanese Forces politicians
Lebanese Maronites
Marada Movement politicians
People from Zgharta
People of the Lebanese Civil War
Presidents of Lebanon
Warlords
Agriculture ministers of Lebanon
Interior ministers of Lebanon
Lebanese anti-communists
20th-century Lebanese politicians
Postal services ministers of Lebanon
Justice ministers of Lebanon